von Bergen is a surname. Notable people with the surname include:

Diego von Bergen (1872–1944), German ambassador
Drew Von Bergen (1940–2017), American journalist 
John von Bergen (born 1971), American artist
Karl August von Bergen (1704–1759), German anatomist and botanist
Maria von Bergen (1840–1927), Swedish school director
Nora von Bergen (born 1990), Swiss ice dancer
Pennie Von Bergen Wessels (born 1949), American Democratic politician 
Steve von Bergen (born 1983), Swiss footballer

See also
Van Bergen (disambiguation)